Madeco S.A. is a diversified group of industrial companies manufacturing flexible packaging mainly for the food industry, copper tubes and aluminum and PVC window and door profiles. The company is based in Chile and also operates in Argentina, Colombia and Peru through its subsidiary Alusa.

Madeco belongs to Quiñenco, part of Luksic Group.

Madeco S.A. trades on the Santiago stock exchange under the name MADECO.

History 
Madeco was founded as a result of the division of Madeco S.A. (currently Invexans S.A.), agreed by the Extraordinary Shareholders' Meeting held on March 27, 2013.

References

External links

Manufacturing companies based in Santiago
Manufacturing companies established in 2013
Chilean companies established in 2013